Gighay (Scottish Gaelic Gioghaigh) an uninhabited island off the northeast coast of Barra. It is one of ten islands in the Sound of Barra, a Site of Community Importance for conservation in the Outer Hebrides of Scotland.

Geography and geology
One of a string of islands between South Uist and Barra, Gighay is "locked" into its neighbour Hellisay, with a harbour between. It is mainly gneiss with quartz veins.

Gighay is owned by the Scottish Ministers (i.e. the Scottish government).

Notes and references

Islands of the Sound of Barra
Uninhabited islands of the Outer Hebrides